The Ultimate Collection is a compilation album released in 2010 by American singer Barbra Streisand.

The album peaked at #8 in the United Kingdom, with sales of 24,736.

The Ultimate Collection was the 51st best-selling album of 2011 in the UK, with sales of 231,000. The BPI certified the album Platinum on December 20, 2013.

In Canada the album peaked at number 24 and had sold 23,357 copies as of March 2013. It was certified Gold in Hungary.

Track listing

Charts

Weekly charts

Year-end charts

Certifications and sales

References

2010 compilation albums
Barbra Streisand compilation albums
Legacy Recordings compilation albums
Columbia Records compilation albums